The Adelphian Society was a literary society founded on July 24, 1840, at the Hamilton Literary and Theological Institution (today Colgate University) in Hamilton, New York. The college literary society was organized on October 31, 1840, when the founding officers were elected. The society was formed by 31 men led by its first president, Orrin Bishop Judd. The purpose of the society was to “progress in literary attainments and cultivation among all the members of an undecaying friendship."
 
The Adelphian Society was founded on the same day as the Aeonian Society. The literary societies were built on the remains of the Gamma Phi and Pi Delta Societies. The Gamma Phi Society was founded prior to 1833 and Pi Delta probably originated in 1834. Little trace of their activities remain. Competition between them for members led to faculty intervention, with the result that both seem to have been dissolved in 1840 when the Adelphian and Aeonian Societies came into existence.

In 1850, five members of the Adelphian Society transferred to the newly formed University of Rochester and founded the Delphic Society.

On December 10, 1880, the Adelphian Society became a chapter of the national Beta Theta Pi fraternity.

See also
List of literary societies in the United States
List of societies at Colgate University

References

College literary societies in the United States